This was the first edition of the tournament.

Marcelo Demoliner and David Vega Hernández won the title after defeating Rameez Junaid and David Pel 7–6(7–3), 6–3 in the final.

Seeds

Draw

References
 Main Draw

Sánchez-Casal Mapfre Cup - Doubles